Gösta Andersson (18 January 1918 in Umeå, Sweden – 24 November 1979 in Holmsund, Sweden) was a Swedish cross-country skier who won the Vasaloppet ski race in 1944 with a margin of one second before Nils Karlsson (Mora-Nisse).

References

1918 births
1979 deaths
People from Umeå Municipality
Vasaloppet winners
Swedish male cross-country skiers
IFK Umeå skiers